Gentes may refer to:

 Gens (pl. Gentes), in Ancient Rome, a family of those sharing the same nomen and a common ancestor
 Gens (behaviour) (pl. Gentes), in animal behavior, a host-specific lineage of a brood parasite species
 Gentes (Star Wars), a fictional planet in the Star Wars universe
 Ad gentes, a decree by the Second Vatican Council